Theodore Levin (February 18, 1897 – December 31, 1970) was a United States district judge of the United States District Court for the Eastern District of Michigan.

Education and career

Levin was born on February 18, 1897, in Chicago, Illinois, the son of Joseph and Ida (Rosin) Levin. The family moved to London, Ontario, Canada and then to Detroit, Michigan. He received a Bachelor of Laws in 1920 from the University of Detroit Law School (now the University of Detroit Mercy School of Law) and a Master of Laws in 1924 from the same institution. He was admitted to the bar in 1920 and commenced private practice in Detroit from 1920 to 1946. In 1936, he formed the law firm Levin, Levin, Garvett & Dill with his brother Saul, Morris Garvett and Louis Dill. He specialized in immigration and naturalization law.

Federal judicial service

Levin was nominated by President Harry S. Truman on July 3, 1946, to a seat on the United States District Court for the Eastern District of Michigan vacated by Judge Edward Julien Moinet. He was confirmed by the United States Senate on July 25, 1946, and received his commission on July 27, 1946. He served as Chief Judge from 1959 to 1967. His service terminated on December 31, 1970, due to his death.

Philanthropy, other service and honors

Levin served as president of several major Detroit organizations: the Jewish Welfare Federation of Detroit, the United Jewish Committee, the Jewish Social Service Bureau and the Resettlement Service. He was a member and served on the boards of the Detroit Community Fund, the Council of Social Agencies, the Big Brother Conference, and the United Health and Welfare Fund of Michigan. He was an active member of the Detroit Round Table of Catholics, Jews and Protestants. He was in the Scottish Rite of Free Masonry and a 33rd degree Mason. In October 1994, Congress passed legislation renaming the federal courthouse in Detroit the Theodore Levin United States Courthouse. In 1961, he received a Doctor of Laws degree from Wayne State University and in 1970, a Doctor of Humane Letters from Hebrew Union College.

Family

Levin was married to Rhoda Katzin of Chicago. Their son Charles Levin served as a Michigan Supreme Court Justice from 1973 to 1996. Another son, Joseph Levin, was a candidate for a seat in the United States House of Representatives in 1974, and a third son, Daniel Levin, is a real estate developer in Chicago. His daughter Mimi Levin Lieber served on the New York State Board of Regents. His nephew Carl Levin was a former United States Senator, his nephew Sander Levin was a United States representative for Michigan's 12th District, and his great-nephew Andy Levin served as a Representative for Michigan's 9th District.

See also
List of Jewish American jurists

References

External links
Article upon renaming of U.S. Courthouse in Detroit after him in 1995

1897 births
1970 deaths
Theodore Levin
Michigan Democrats
Judges of the United States District Court for the Eastern District of Michigan
United States district court judges appointed by Harry S. Truman
University of Detroit Mercy alumni
Jewish American people in Michigan politics
Lawyers from Chicago
Lawyers from Detroit
20th-century American judges
American expatriates in Canada